John Honai is a 2015  Malayalam language film produced by  P T Saleem. The film stars Siddique as John Honai in the lead role along with Malavika Menon, Jagadish and Mukesh in the major roles. The films is directed by T A Thufeeq. The music is composed by Alex Paul. The screenplay is based on a story written by Fazal. The film's name gives the impression that it is a sequel to the comedies "In Harihar Nagar", "2 Harihar Nagar" and "In Ghost House Inn", but it is completely unconnected.

Plot 
The film tells the story of three men named John, Jaffer and Janardhanan. John has an accident with a rich merchant named Devanarayanan. Devanarayanan hands him a blank cheque and on the very next day he gets killed. John, Jaffer and Janardhanan receive three crore rupees through the cheque and decide to spend it in Dubai as a holiday trip. At the same time, Sreenivasan, an investigating officer, also reaches Dubai with them from Kerala. Once they reach Dubai they are allotted a tourist guide by Janardhanan's friend. There, they also have to face John Honai, the real owner of the three crore rupees who has come from Kerala to retrieve it. The difficulties faced by John, Jaffer and Janardhanan to solve the problems that they face in Dubai forms the crux of the film.

Cast 

Mukesh as Sreenivasan        
Siddique as John Honai
 Kalabhavan Navas as Jaffer
Rizabawa as Devanarayanan
S P Sreekumar as Janardhanan
Malavika Menon as Maria
Mamukkoya as Gafoorikka
Ashokan as Johny Valookkaran        
Jagadish  as Banker Vasudeva  Kammath                   
 Jaise Jose

Soundtrack 
The music is composed by Alex Paul along with Afsal, Vidhu Prathap and Rimy Tomy.

 "Manikyam Pole" – Pradeep Babu, Ramesh Babu
 "Onnu Parayille" – Rimy Tomy, Vidhu Prathap
 "Thathaka Thathka" – Afsal

See also
 Siddique-lal

References

External links 

2015 films
2010s Malayalam-language films